Saint John was a provincial electoral district for the Legislative Assembly of New Brunswick, Canada. It used a bloc voting system to elect candidates. It was split into the ridings of Saint John City and Saint John County in 1795.

Members of the Legislative Assembly

Election results

References

Former provincial electoral districts of New Brunswick